Virpur is a town in Rajkot district of Gujarat, India. Virpur is the birthplace of saint Jalaram and had a temple dedicated to him here which is popular among pilgrims. Virpur was established and ruled by Koli chieftain Viro Bariyo.

Temples
Virparanath, Jethabapa and Jalaram Bapa are saints associated with this town and many of its religious sites. Religious sites in Virpur include:

Jalaram Mandir
Samadhi of Jalaram Bapa – the resting place of Jalaram Bapa. 
Virparanath Mandir – Saint Virparanath Mandir is located close to Jalaram Bapa Mandir. Many pilgrims who visit Jalaram Bapa also visit this shrine. Virpur is named after Virpara Nath who lived here 400 years ago.  
Samadhi of Jetha Bapa – a sacred shrine that stands close to the Jalaram Bapa Mandir. 
Minaldevi Wav – a step-well where women pray for children.
Ramji Mandir, situated in Tower chowk, made by Virpur King
Swaninarayan mandir near, Jalaram bapa mandir
Veer Hanumanji Mandir, very old, almost 300 years ago, made by Khakhi Mahatma( beside Ramji Mandir).
 Radha Krishna Mandir- towards Ramji mandir to Jalaram mandir
Gayatri Mandir - a modern temple located east of Jalaram Bapa Mandir.
Mankeshwar Mahadev - a temple of Lord Shiva near Minaldevi Wav
Gala Vada Hanuman Mandir – located east of Gayatri Mandir on Navagam Road.
Virbai Maa Mandir at Triveni Sangam – a temple dedicated to Virabhai, wife of Jalaram Bapa, located northwest of town.
Khodiyar Mandir - located southwest of Mavtar Vrudhashram [old age home] in the outskirts of the town.
Shree KhodalDham, Kagvad  - a massive modern temple of Khodiyar Maa  at southwest .

Jalaram Bapa Mandir
Jalaram was a Hindu saint from Gujarat, India. He was born in Virpur, Rajkot district, Gujarat, India, on 4 November 1799, which is the 7th day Krishna Paksha of Kartik month on the Hindu calendar VS year 1856, one week after the Hindu festival of Diwali. His father was Pradhan Thakkar and his mother was Rajbai Thakkar, who belonged to Lohana, a merchant clan. He was a devotee of the Hindu god Rama. Numerous temples across the world have been built in his name. The main shrine of Jalaram Bapa is located at Virpur. The shrine is actually the housing complex where Jalaram lived during his lifetime.  The shrine houses the belongings of Jalaram and the deities of Rama, Sita, Lakshmana and Hanuman worshipped by him. It also has on display the Jholi and Danda said to be given to him by God, however the main attraction is the portrait of Jalaram Bapa. There is also a black and white photo of Jalaram Bapa, taken one year before his death. Millions of followers visit Virpur on the anniversary of Jalaram Bapa's birth, which is celebrated as Jalaram Jayanti. on the seventh day of the bright fortnight in the Hindu calendar month on Kartika. There are many guest houses in Virpur to accommodate tourists and pilgrims. Money is not accepted at the Jalaram Bapa temple. Some Dharamshalas serve food to visitors free of cost and without taking a donation. Most people would not be aware that pujya Shree Jaysukhrambapa decided on the year 2000 not to accept any donation at the virpur jalaram temple. Since that year no offerings in cash or kind are accepted at the virpur temple. Jalaram bapa mandir situated in Virpur is the only temple in the world which does not accept any offerings and still feed hundreds of people every single day.
Virpur's economy is largely supported by tourism for pilgrims and visitors.

Connectivity
The nearest towns are Gondal,  Jetpur and Dhoraji. The nearest airport is Rajkot Airport.

References

Cities and towns in Rajkot district
Hindu pilgrimage sites in India